Iron Rattler is a steel roller coaster located at Six Flags Fiesta Texas in San Antonio. Originally opening as a wooden coaster called Rattler in 1992, it was converted to steel and renamed Iron Rattler in 2013. Designed by Alan Schilke and built by Rocky Mountain Construction (RMC), the ride features a zero-g-roll inversion, which was a first among hybrid coasters made of wood and steel.

The wooden Rattler was constructed by the now-defunct and controversial Roller Coaster Corporation of America, opening as the tallest and fastest wooden coaster in the world. Following head and neck injury reports, Rattler was toned down in 1994 with a major reduction to its first drop. RMC modified the wooden Rattler by placing new steel track on top of the existing wooden support structure.

History

Wooden coaster 
The Rattler had been constructed by Roller Coaster Corporation of America. Designer John Pierce stated that the original plans kept changing as park co-developers Gaylord Entertainment Company insisted on having the tallest wooden coaster in the world.

In late 2009, Six Flags Over Texas closed its Texas Giant wooden roller coaster for a $10 million renovation which took more than a year to complete. Idaho-based firm Rocky Mountain Construction (RMC) replaced the wooden track with a new steel I-Box track, retaining a wooden support structure. The refurbishment was ultimately a success with "resoundingly positive reviews from riders". The park's parent company, Six Flags, immediately began looking for other rides in its chain which would benefit from a similar overhaul.

Hybrid refurbishment 
At the IAAPA 2011 Trade Show, Alan Schilke of RMC revealed that the company had two projects that it would be working on for 2013 openings – one of which was an I-Box conversion of a wooden roller coaster. It was later revealed by the Spokane Journal of Business that The Rattler would be completely refurbished in 2013 with new track and trains in a manner similar to that used by the company on the New Texas Giant at Six Flags Over Texas in 2011. Although Six Flags had not publicly confirmed its plans, the park announced that The Rattler would close on August 5, 2012. At the end of the operating day on August 5, 2012, park personnel and select enthusiasts took the final ride, after which, The Rattler, as a wood coaster, ceased operation.

Six Flags Fiesta Texas announced in August 2012 that the now-closed Rattler would be revamped into a steel-tracked coaster called Iron Rattler. The renovation would be performed by Rocky Mountain Construction and would feature the I-Box steel track on some of the original wooden coaster supports, Rattler-themed trains supplied by Gerstlauer, and a barrel roll. The new ride would open for the 2013 season.

The National Roller Coaster Museum and Archives announced on April 16, 2013, that the first rides of Iron Rattler, taking place on the evening of May 17, 2013, would be auctioned off with proceeds going to the museum. A soft-opening was held to the media on May 15, 2013. The grand opening of the Iron Rattler took place May 25, 2013. Following the deadly incident on the New Texas Giant on July 19, 2013, Six Flags Fiesta Texas temporarily closed Iron Rattler, pending investigation findings from its sister park, because the two rides share several similarities. In under a month, Iron Rattler reopened on August 14 with seat belts as another added restraint to the two trains.

Characteristics

Iron Rattler is located in the Western-themed Crackaxle Canyon area of Fiesta Texas, sitting next to the Road Runner Express and The Gully Washer. It is Rocky Mountain Construction's second installation of I-Box track, and the first to feature a barrel roll inversion. Iron Rattler operates with two Rattler-themed trains manufactured by Gerstlauer. Each train is made up of six cars which seat riders in two rows of two. Riders are restrained through the use of a lap bar and a seat belt.

The table below compares the original Rattler, with the updated Iron Rattler ride. The original ride by the Roller Coaster Corporation of America was approximately  longer due to a 900° helix atop the quarry walls. The refurbished ride by Rocky Mountain Construction features a steeper and longer first drop, thus achieving a faster speed.

Ride experience

The ride begins by exiting out of the station and turning around under Road Runner Express. It ascends a  chain lift hill, before dropping  at an angle of 81°. The track then ascends to the top of the quarry wall where it enters a 110° over-banked turn. A 95° over-banked turn leads to the left, back off the quarry wall. The ride then rises into the zero-g roll which sits atop the quarry wall. A camelback hill is followed by two more over-banked turns measuring 98° and 93°, respectively. The ride then drops back off the quarry wall and enters a tunnel near its base. The tunnel features fog and lighting effects. After exiting the tunnel, the train enters brake run and returns to the station.

Reception

Iron Rattler has generally been well received. Keith Miller of Funworld Magazine described the ride as "wonderfully smooth" highlighting the slow cresting of the lift hill as an "enjoyable element". He concludes by stating "there's not one restful moment on this ride". Arthur Levine of About.com gave the ride 4.5 out of 5 stars. Levine applauded Six Flags for replacing a bad wooden roller coaster with "a wonderful, remarkably smooth, thoroughly fun and enjoyable ride". He also gives kudos to Rocky Mountain Construction who manufactured the I-Box track and redesigned the ride. Brenda Solis of KLQB described the ride as "the most intense, craziest roller coaster ever". She also compared the renovated ride to the original ride, stating "the old Rattler wasn't as scary or intense or fast as the new one".

Before Iron Rattler's debut year, Rattler was only ranked once in the Amusement Today's Golden Ticket Awards for the 2011 Top 50 Wooden Coasters ranked at 47 in the world, since the creation of the award in 1998. After the renovation in 2013, Iron Rattler was ranked highly by the voters. The ride was ranked the second-best new ride of 2013 with 19% of the vote. It also ranked at position 11 for the world's best steel roller coasters its debut year.

Awards

References

External links
 
 
 Iron Rattler at Rocky Mountain Construction

Roller coasters operated by Six Flags
Roller coasters in Texas
Six Flags Fiesta Texas
Hybrid roller coasters